The Ithaca Voice is a non-profit digital news outlet based in Ithaca, New York. It provides coverage of Ithaca and Tompkins County. Founded in 2014, the outlet is community-supported and available free of charge.

In 2020, the outlet averaged 130,000 unique monthly readers and published 1,459 articles.

References

External links 

 

Mass media in Ithaca, New York
Publications established in 2014
Newspapers published in New York (state)